Red Balloon is a South Korean television series starring Seo Ji-hye, Lee Sung-jae, Hong Soo-hyun, and Lee Sang-woo. It premiered on TV Chosun on December 17, 2022, and aired every Saturday and Sunday at 21:10 (KST) timeslot.

Synopsis
Red Balloon tells the story of main character Jo Eun-kang (Seo Ji-hye) and her circle of friends and relatives, who wish to fulfill their goals after having prior setbacks. Together, they find themselves entangled in multiple conflicts and affairs.

Cast

Main
 Seo Ji-hye as Jo Eun-kang
 Lee Sung-jae as Ji Nam-chul
 Hong Soo-hyun as Han Ba-da
 Lee Sang-woo as Go Cha-won
 Jung Yu-min as Jo Eun-san, Eun-kang's younger sister

Supporting
 Yoon Mi-ra as Na Gong-ju, Ba-da's mother-in-law
 Yoon Joo-sang as Ba-da's father-in-law
 Lee Bo-hee as Yang Ban-suk, Eun-kang's mother
 Jeong Bo-seok as Jo Dae-bong, Eun-kang's father
 Kim Hye-sun as Ko Geum-ah, Nam-chul's wife
 Choi Dae-chul as Jo Dae-geun, Eun-san's uncle
 Lee Sang-sook as Yeo Jeon-hee, Ba-da's mother
 Seol Jung-hwan as Kwon Tae-gi, Eun-kang's boyfriend

Original soundtrack

Part 1

Part 2

Part 3

Part 4

Part 5

Part 6

Part 7

Viewership

References

External links
  
 
 

TV Chosun television dramas
Korean-language television shows
Television series by Chorokbaem Media
2022 South Korean television series debuts
2023 South Korean television series endings